Menz Lalo Midir (Amharic: መንዝ ላሎ ምድር) is one of the woredas in the Amhara Region of Ethiopia. It is named after the district of the former province of Menz, Lalo Meder. Located in the Semien Shewa Zone, Menz Lalo Midir is bordered on the southeast by Menz Mam Midir, on the west by Menz Keya Gebreal, and on the north by Menz Gera Midir. Menz Lalo Midir was part of former Mam Midrina Lalo Midir woreda.

Demographics
Based on the 2007 national census conducted by the Central Statistical Agency of Ethiopia (CSA), this woreda has a total population of 17,308, of whom 8,643 are men and 8,665 women; none are urban inhabitants. The majority of the inhabitants practiced Ethiopian Orthodox Christianity, with 99.93% reporting that as their religion.

Notes

Districts of Amhara Region